Ahmedabad–Dholera Expressway is a  long, four-lane wide (expandable to eight) access-controlled under-construction expressway in Gujarat, India. It will connect Sardar Patel Ring Road near Sarkhej in Ahmedabad with Adhelai village in Bhavnagar district via Dholera Special Investment Region (DSIR).

The Ahmedabad–Dholera greenfield expressway is a part of the Delhi–Mumbai Industrial Corridor (DMIC) and is expected to be ready by March 2023.

Construction
The NHAI has divided the construction work of Ahmedabad–Dholera Expressway into four packages. Its total construction cost (excluding the cost of land) is about ₹3,196 crores. 

The list of contractors is as follows:

Status updates
 Apr 2020: Tenders floated for construction of expressway by the NHAI.
 Aug 2020: Tenders awarded in EPC mode to Sadbhav Engineering (Package 1 and 2), GHV India Pvt. Ltd. (Package 3) and Dineshchandra R. Agrawal Infracon Pvt. Ltd. (Package 4).
 April 2022: Work on progress

References

Expressways in Gujarat
Proposed expressways in India
Transport in Ahmedabad